Vincent Vesele Tshabalala (16 March 1942 – 3 June 2017) was a South African professional golfer. He won a number of tournaments organised by the non-white Tournament Players Association and in 1976 he won the French Open.

Biography
Tshabalala was born on 16 March 1942 to Philip and Maria Tshabalala in Rietvlei and had eight siblings. He attended George Goch school and shortly thereafter completed an apprenticeship as a mechanic. Tshabalala was introduced to golf at Rietvlei Golf Club, where he worked as a caddie after school, and saved up for golf clubs to pursue his passion for golf, a sport that was historically a white sport. When he turned professional it was with a mixed set of clubs bought one by one. Tshabalala is from the Zulu ethnic group.

Tshabalala started competing professionally in the 1960s on the Non-European Tour, where he had six wins, four second-place finished and third place once. He was barred from the Southern African Tour in his prime during the 1970s as a result of apartheid; however with assistance from Gary Player he gained entry to tournaments on the European Tour. He made his European Tour debut at the Madrid Open at Puerto de Hierro on 28 April 1976, finishing tied for 45th place. The following week (on 9 May 1976), he claimed a shock victory in the Open de France at Le Touquet while pulling his own bag, finishing two strokes ahead of Salvador Balbuena, winning £3,570. He was the first black man to win on the European Tour. That season, he played nine events and would finish joint 7th in the Sumrie-Bournemouth Better-Ball (with John O'Leary), 17th at the Italian Open and joint 21st in the Piccadilly Medal.

Later in 1976, Tshabalala was selected to represent South Africa with Gary Player in the 1976 World Cup but refused for political reasons. He also played on the Southern Africa Tour after racial restrictions preventing black golfers from playing the tour were removed in the early 1970s. He finished in the top-10 10 times and in the top-15 16 times, counting both regular and senior events. In 1982, Tshabalala became a member of the PGA and as president of the PGA in 1990, he played an integral part in uniting the Professional Golfers Association (PGA) and Tournament Players Association (TGA).

Tshabalala played on the European Seniors Tour from its formation in 1992. He was twice runner-up; behind John Fourie in the 1992 Belfast Telegraph Irish Senior Masters and behind Maurice Bembridge in the 1996 Hippo Jersey Seniors. He won the Nelson Mandela Invitational in both 2004 and 2005, playing with Ernie Els in the former year and with Tim Clark in the latter year.

Tshabalala received several national awards including a Presidential Sports Award from President Thabo Mbeki, inducted to the Southern Africa Golf Hall of Fame in 2010, a lifetime achievement award from Union of Golf Societies in 2005, a certificate of recognition from City of Johannesburg in 2003 for his dedication to overcome racial barriers in sport and a golf award from SABC Sports for his excellent contribution to the promotion and development of golf as the premier sport in South Africa.

After his active career he became a dedicated teacher of golf, more of interest to help and see people gain than to earn money. For four years he worked as pro at Mälarbadens GC in Sweden during the summers.

Tshabalala played his full shots cross-handed.

Tshabalala died on 3 June 2017 at the age of 75. He is buried at Avalon cemetery in Soweto.

Professional wins (9)

European Tour wins (1)

Other European wins (6)
1965 South African Non-European Open
1971 South African Non-European Open
1972 Transvaal Non-European Open, Natal Non-European Open
1977 South African Non-European Open
1983 South African Non-European Open

Other wins (2)

Results in major championships

Note: Tshabalala only played in The Open Championship.
CUT = missed the half-way cut
"T" = tied

References

External links
 
 

South African male golfers
European Tour golfers
Sunshine Tour golfers
European Senior Tour golfers
Golfers from Johannesburg
1942 births
2017 deaths